Cyril Benzaquen (born 2 October 1989) is a French Muay Thai fighter and kickboxer. He is the current ISKA World Light Heavyweight Oriental Rules champion.

As an amateur, Benzaquen twice medaled at the World Muaythai Federation World Championships and the once at the IFMA European Championships.

Personal life
Cyril works as a model, and has achieved a BAC + 5 at the University of Paris Dauphine. He is of Moroccan-Jewish origin and of "traditionalist" Jewish faith.

After obtaining a scientific baccalauréat, he continued his studies at the IUT of Sceaux where he obtained a DUT in marketing. He then joined Paris-Dauphine University in a management license adapted to high-level athletes, then in a traditional management license, from which he graduated respectively in 2011 and 2013. He obtained a master's degree in marketing in 2014 and a master's degree in entrepreneurship in 2015. For his end-of-studies project, supported by the It Agency, he organized the Dauphine Boxing Tour.

Martial arts career

Early career
Benzaquen made his professional debut against Didier Charlesege at La Nuit Des Combattants on May 22, 2010. He won the fight by unanimous decision. He suffered his first professional loss in his very next fight, as Raphael Mebenga beat him by unanimous decision at France Vs Thaïlande : Mabel Vs Saiyoke on October 29, 2010.

Benzaquen rebounded by winning his next four fights: he beat Alassane Sy by decision at La Bataille De L'Ile De France on December 10, 2010, Willy Prophete by decision at VXS Kickboxing Show on April 23, 2011, René Dione at La Nuit du Kick Boxing on November 26, 2011, and Manuel Romero at Kick-Boxing Show on October 13, 2012. He fought to a draw with Arthur Kouane at Konateam Cup on May 21, 2012.

Benzaquen's four-fight winning streak was snapped by a two-fight losing skid, as he dropped decisions to Francis Tavares at VXS Niglo New Concept on May 11, 2013, and Malik Aliane at Boxing Factory Trophy 2013 on May 25, 2013. He split wins and losses in his next two appearances, as he stopped Giorgio Galasso with a spinning backfist at Lion Promotion & NCA Web on December 1, 2013, but lost a decision to Djibril Ehouo at Grande Soirée de la Boxe on February 1, 2014.

Benzequan's victory over René Dione at Demi-Finales Nationales Japan Kick on April 5, 2014, earned him the chance to fight Abderrahim Chafay for the FFSCDA -81 kg title at Night Fighter 1 on April 26, 2014. He captured his first professional title by a second-round technical knockout.

ISKA Light heavyweight champion
Benzaquen faced Adelino Boa Morte for the vacant ISKA World Oriental Rules Light Heavyweight (-81.5 kg) championship at Dauphine Boxing Tour on November 27, 2015. He captured the title by unanimous decision. This victory earned Benzaquen his Glory debut, as he was booked to face Cédric Tousch at Glory 28: Paris on March 12, 2016. He lost the fight by unanimous decision.

Benzaquen made his first ISKA Light heavyweight title defense against Kevin Ward at Cavalaire Kickboxing Show on May 28, 2016. He retained the title by unanimous decision. Benzaquen then made two non-title bout appearances at Super Muaythai events. He first overcame Chase Walden by unanimous decision on August 12, 2016, which he followed up by another unanimous decision victory against Denis MuaythaiAcademy on February 4, 2017. Benzaquen made his ACB debut against Alexander Stetsurenko at ACB KB 13: From Paris with war on March 25, 2017. He won the fight by unanimous decision.

Benzaquen made his second ISKA World Oriental rules title defense against Mbamba Cauwenbergh at Triumph Fighting Tour on June 22, 2017. He retained the title by unanimous decision. Benzaquen challenged Elijah Bokeli for the WAKO-Pro World K-1 Light heavyweight title at Triumph Fighting Tour on November 30, 2018. He lost the fight by unanimous decision.

Bezaquen made his third ISKA title defense against Daniel Frigola at Triumph Fighting Tour on June 13, 2019. He won the fight by unanimous decision. Benzaquen made his third ISKA title defense against Ioannis Sofokleous at Triumph Fighting Tour on December 12, 2019. He retained the title by unanimous decision.

Benzaquen made his sixth ISKA title defense in a match against Florin Lambagiu on May 31, 2022, at Grand Palais Éphémère in Paris, France. He won the fight via unanimous decision, which was found very controversial by several media outlets. The International Sport Karate Association commission eventually denied Lambagiu's appeal, but ordered a rematch within twelve months.

Championships and accomplishments

Professional
International Sport Karate Association
2015 ISKA Oriental Rules Kickboxing World Champion (One time, current)
Five successful title defenses

Amateur
World Muaythai Federation
 2010 WMF World Championships (-81 kg)
 2012 WMF World Championships (-81 kg)
International Federation of Muaythai Associations
  2013 IFMA European Championships (-81 kg)
World Kickboxing Federation
 2013 WKF European K-1 Championships (-81 kg)
 2014 WKF World K-1 Championships (-81 kg)

Kickboxing record

|- style="background:#cfc;"
| 2022-05-31 || Win ||align=left| Florin Lambagiu || Kickboxing Prestige || Paris, France || Decision (Unanimous) || 5 || 3:00
|-
! style=background:white colspan=9 |
|-
|- style="background:#cfc;"
| 2021-07-08 || Win ||align=left| Angelo Mirno || Soiree Kickboxing Prestige || Paris, France || Decision (Unanimous) || 3 || 3:00
|-
|- style="background:#cfc;"
| 2019-12-12|| Win ||align=left| Ioannis Sofokleous || Triumph Fighting Tour || Paris, France || Decision (Unanimous) || 5 || 3:00
|-
! style=background:white colspan=9 |
|- style="background:#cfc;"
| 2019-06-13|| Win ||align=left| Daniel Frigola || Triumph Fighting Tour || Paris, France || Decision (Unanimous) || 5 || 3:00
|-
! style=background:white colspan=9 |
|- style="background:#fbb;"
| 2018-11-30|| Loss ||align=left| Elijah Bokeli || Triumph Fighting Tour || France || Decision (Unanimous) || 5 || 3:00
|-
! style=background:white colspan=9 |
|- style="background:#fbb;"
| 2018-08-04|| Loss ||align=left| Giuseppe De Domenico || Fight Night Saint-Tropez, Tournament Finals || Saint-Tropez, France || Decision (Unanimous) || 3 || 3:00 
|- style="background:#cfc;"
| 2018-08-04|| Win ||align=left| Erik Matejovsky || Fight Night Saint-Tropez, Tournament Semifinals || Saint-Tropez, France || Decision (Unanimous) || 3 || 3:00 
|-
|- style="background:#fbb;"
| 2018-05-05|| Loss ||align=left| Djibril Ehouo || Capital Fights 3 || Paris, France || Decision (Unanimous) || 3 || 3:00
|-
|- style="background:#c5d2ea;"
| 2018-04-08|| Draw ||align=left| Wendy Annonay || Duel 3 || Paris, France || Decision (Unanimous) || 3 || 3:00
|-
|- style="background:#c5d2ea;"
| 2018-02-24|| Draw ||align=left| Darryl Sichtman || ACB KB 13: From Paris with war || Paris, France || Decision (Unanimous) || 3 || 3:00
|-
|- style="background:#fbb;"
| 2017-12-09|| Loss ||align=left| Rémy Vectol || Golden Fight || Levallois-Perret, France || Decision (Unanimous) || 3 || 3:00
|-
|- style="background:#fbb;"
| 2017-11-17|| Loss ||align=left| Malik Aliane || Warriors Night || Paris, France || Decision (Unanimous) || 3 || 3:00
|-
|- style="background:#cfc;"
| 2017-06-22|| Win ||align=left| Mbamba Cauwenbergh || Triumph Fighting Tour || Paris, France || Decision (Unanimous) || 5 || 3:00
|-
! style=background:white colspan=9 |
|-
|- style="background:#cfc;"
| 2017-03-25|| Win ||align=left| Alexander Stetsurenko || ACB KB 9: Showdown in Paris || Paris, France || Decision (Unanimous) || 3 || 3:00
|-
|- style="background:#cfc;"
| 2017-02-04|| Win ||align=left| Denis MuaythaiAcademy || Super Muaythai || Bangkok, Thailand || Decision (Unanimous) || 3 || 3:00
|- style="background:#cfc;"
| 2016-08-12|| Win ||align=left| Chase Walden || Super Muaythai || Bangkok, Thailand || Decision (Unanimous) || 3 || 3:00
|-
|- style="background:#cfc;"
| 2016-05-28|| Win ||align=left| Kevin Ward || Cavalaire Kickboxing Show || Paris, France || Decision (Unanimous) || 5 || 3:00
|-
! style=background:white colspan=9 |
|-
|- style="background:#fbb;"
| 2016-03-12|| Loss ||align=left| Cédric Tousch || Glory 28: Paris || Paris, France || Decision (Unanimous) || 3 || 3:00
|-
|- style="background:#cfc;"
| 2015-11-27|| Win ||align=left| Adelino Boa Morte || Dauphine Boxing Tour || Paris, France || Decision (Unanimous) || 5 || 3:00
|-
! style=background:white colspan=9 |
|-
|- style="background:#cfc;"
| 2015-02-21 || Win ||align=left| Reda Hameur-Lain || Le Choc des Best Fighters 3 || Asnières-sur-Seine, France || TKO (Retirement) || 2 || 3:00
|-
|- style="background:#cfc;"
| 2014-04-26 || Win ||align=left| Abderrahim Chafay || Night Fighter 1 || Toulouse, France || TKO (Punches) || 2 || 
|-
! style=background:white colspan=9 |
|-
|- style="background:#cfc;"
| 2014-04-05 || Win ||align=left| René Dione || Demi-Finales Nationales Japan Kick || Groslay, France || Decision || 3 || 3:00 
|-
|- style="background:#fbb;"
| 2014-02-01 || Loss ||align=left| Djibril Ehouo || Grande Soirée de la Boxe || La Riche, France || Decision || 3 || 3:00 
|-
|- style="background:#cfc;"
| 2013-12-01 || Win ||align=left| Giorgio Galasso || Lion Promotion & NCA Web || Trieste, Italy || KO (Spinning backfist) || 4 || 
|-
|- style="background:#fbb;"
| 2013-05-25|| Loss ||align=left| Malik Aliane || Boxing Factory Trophy 2013 || Colomiers, France || Decision || 5 || 3:00 
|-
|- style="background:#fbb;"
| 2013-05-11 || Loss ||align=left| Francis Tavares || VXS Niglo New Concept || Montpellier, France || Decision || 3 || 3:00 
|-
|- style="background:#cfc;"
| 2012-10-13 || Win ||align=left| Manuel Romero || Kick-Boxing Show || Saint-Paul-de-Vence, France || Decision || 3 || 3:00
|-
|- style="background:#c5d2ea;"
| 2012-05-21 || Draw ||align=left| Arthur Kouane || Konateam Cup || Villiers-sur-Marne, France || Decision || 3 || 3:00
|-
|- style="background:#cfc;"
| 2011-11-26 || Win ||align=left| René Dione || La Nuit du Kick Boxing || Les Mureaux, France || Decision || 3 || 3:00
|-
|- style="background:#cfc;"
| 2011-04-23 || Win ||align=left| Willy Prophete || VXS Kickboxing Show || Persan, France || Decision || 3 || 3:00
|-
|- style="background:#cfc;"
| 2010-12-10 || Win ||align=left| Alassane Sy || La Bataille De L'Ile De France || Nanterre, France || Decision || 3 || 3:00
|-
|- style="background:#fbb;"
| 2010-10-29|| Loss ||align=left| Raphael Mebenga || France Vs Thaïlande : Mabel Vs Saiyoke || Paris, France || Decision (Unanimous) || 5 || 3:00
|-
|- style="background:#cfc;"
| 2010-05-22 || Win ||align=left| Didier Charlesege || La Nuit Des Combattants || Persan, France || Decision (Unanimous) || 3 || 3:00
|-
| colspan=9 | Legend:    

|-  style="background:#cfc"
| 2014-03-23 || Win ||align=left| Luis Bernica || 2014 WKF World Championships, Tournament Final || Pattaya, Thailand || Decision || 3 || 2:00
|-
! style=background:white colspan=9 |
|-
|-  style="background:#cfc"
| 2014-03-22 || Win ||align=left| Mandel de Jesus || 2014 WKF World Championships, Tournament Semifinal || Pattaya, Thailand || Decision || 3 || 2:00
|-
|-  style="background:#cfc"
| 2013-11-02 || Win ||align=left| Henrich Pavel || 2013 WKF European Championships, Tournament Final || Bregenz, Austria || Decision || 3 || 2:00
|-
! style=background:white colspan=9 |
|-
|-  style="background:#cfc"
| 2013-10-30 || Win ||align=left| Milan Pokermi || 2013 WKF European Championships, Tournament Semifinal || Bregenz, Austria || Decision || 3 || 2:00
|-
|-  style="background:#cfc"
| 2013-10-28 || Win ||align=left| Thomas Gute || 2013 WKF European Championships, Tournament Quarterfinal || Bregenz, Austria || Decision || 3 || 2:00
|-
|-  style="background:#fbb"
| 2012-03-24 || Loss ||align=left| Richard Jocr || 2012 WMF World Championships, Tournament Final || Bangkok, Thailand || Decision || 3 || 2:00
|-
! style=background:white colspan=9 |
|-
|-  style="background:#cfc"
| 2012-03-23 || Win ||align=left| Somtos Losta || 2012 WMF World Championships, Tournament Semifinal || Bangkok, Thailand || Decision || 3 || 2:00
|-
|-  style="background:#cfc"
| 2012-03-22 || Win ||align=left| Natan Borovitsky || 2012 WMF World Championships, Tournament Quarterfinal || Bangkok, Thailand || Decision || 3 || 2:00
|-
|-  style="background:#fbb"
| 2010-03-23 || Loss ||align=left| Pavel Revtovich || 2010 WMF World Championships, Tournament Final || Bangkok, Thailand || Decision || 3 || 2:00
|-
! style=background:white colspan=9 |
|-
|-  style="background:#cfc"
| 2010-03-22 || Win ||align=left| Roberto Martullo || 2010 WMF World Championships, Tournament Semifinal || Bangkok, Thailand || Decision || 3 || 2:00
|-
|-  style="background:#cfc"
| 2010-03-21 || Win ||align=left| Alessandro Lopez || 2010 WMF World Championships, Tournament Quarterfinal || Bangkok, Thailand || Decision || 3 || 2:00
|-
| colspan=9 | Legend:

Professional boxing record

See also

 List of male kickboxers

References

External links
 Cyril Benzaquen at Muaythai TV
 Cyril Benzaquen at Global Fight Center

French male kickboxers
1989 births
People from Clamart
French Muay Thai practitioners
Living people
Sportspeople from Hauts-de-Seine